Little Magnets Versus the Bubble of Babble is the third and final album by UK pop rock band Transvision Vamp. The album was released in 1991, two years after their UK No. 1 album Velveteen.

This album didn't get a U.K. release at the time due to disputes with their label. Little Magnets Versus the Bubble of Babble took on a more mellow sound which was the reason that their record company at one stage refused to release it – it was eventually released in the US but not in the UK at the time. It was however, released in Australia where the band had enjoyed considerable success. The album peaked at No. 25 on the Australian Albums Chart. It was released in New Zealand where it reached No.14, and also released in Sweden reaching No.27. Little Magnets Versus the Bubble of Babble produced a few singles but before a UK release could be re-considered, Transvision Vamp broke up.

This was the first (and only) Transvision Vamp album to feature co-writing credits for Wendy James.

Track listing
All songs by Nick Sayer, except where noted.

 "(I Just Wanna) B with U" (James, Sayer) – 4:22
 "Ain't No Rules" – 4:48
 "If Looks Could Kill" – 4:12
 "Every Little Thing" – 4:04
 "Twangy Wigout" (Serge Gainsbourg, James, Sayer) – 4:15
 "Don't Believe the Type" (James, Sayer) – 5:28
 "Pressure Times" – 5:21
 "Crawl Out Your Window" (Bob Dylan) – 3:34
 "You Put a Spell on Me" – 4:24
 "Back on My Knees Again" (James, Sayer) – 2:49

Personnel
Transvision Vamp
 Wendy James – vocals 
 Nick Christian Sayer – guitar 
 Dave Parsons – bass 
 Tex Axile – drums
Willie Wilcox – drums
with:
Jody Linscott – percussion
Chyna Gordon – backing vocals

Technical
Ben Barlow, Darren Allison – mix engineer
Alan Moulder – mixing

Charts

References

1991 albums
Transvision Vamp albums
MCA Records albums